In the twelve editions of the World Cup of Darts tournament organized by the Professional Darts Corporation, there have been 43 different nations to compete. This is a list of all teams that have participated, organised by country.

Overview
As of 2022, of the 43 nations to have competed, 18 of them have played in all twelve tournaments to date. Three new nations are scheduled to make their debut in the 2023 tournament.

Australia

An ever present at the World Cup, Australia had their best performance in 2012 when they reached the final against England. The match went all the way, being decided by a sudden death leg where all four players had darts at double before Adrian Lewis reigned in victory for England. But in 2022, their 10 year agony came to an end when Damon Heta and Simon Whitlock beat Wales in the final to become the 5th different nation to win the trophy.

Austria

Mensur Suljović has led the Austrian team at every World Cup since its inception. The team's best performance was reaching the last eight, which "The Gentle" has achieved five times with three different partners, but in 2021, a fairytale run saw them reach the final before eventually losing to Scotland.

Bahrain

Bahrain will become one of three new nations participating in the World Cup, when they make their debut in 2023.

Belgium

The Belgian team is also unique in being the only team to be composed of brothers, being represented by Kim and Ronny Huybrechts from 2013 to 2017.

Brazil

Brazil was one of two teams to debut in the 2017 World Cup and did so with a first round victory over other debutant Switzerland. Diogo Portela has been an ever-present for the team.

Canada

Triple World champion John Part was an ever-present in this tournament until 2018, with the team reaching the quarter-finals on four separate occasions.

China

China was one of the seven teams to debut in the 2014 World Cup, when the tournament field was increased from 24 to 32 teams. They notably became the second team to have a female representative at the World Cup when Momo Zhou teamed with Zong Xiao Chen in 2018. Owing to COVID-19 restrictions, they had to withdraw from the 2020 tournament, and miss the 2022 tournament altogether.

Croatia

Croatia didn't play in the inaugural World Cup, but were one of the 5 new teams to debut in the 2012 edition. Despite beating New Zealand and Northern Ireland to reach the quarter-finals in 2013, they hadn't been invited back to another World Cup, until a surprise recall in 2021, but they then had to withdraw owing to an illness to Boris Krčmar.

Czech Republic

After being forced to withdraw from the inaugural World Cup in 2010 due to inclement weather, the Czech Republic had to wait until 2015 to make their debut. They have been active in the tournament ever since, but have yet to win a match. Their average of 103.47 in their 2021 loss to Poland was the highest losing average in a first round match at the World Cup of Darts.

Denmark

An ever-present in the competition, the Danes have never gone beyond the last 16 stage.

England

After the humiliating loss to Spain in the inaugural World Cup in 2010, England reached the final in the next 5 editions, winning 4 of them, thanks to the combination of Phil Taylor and Adrian Lewis. Since then, they only reached one final, in which they were whitewashed 3–0 by Wales.

Finland

Another ever-present team, Finland's record is unspectacular with the exception of a surprise semi-final run in 2013, including an upset victory over the Dutch team of Michael van Gerwen and Raymond van Barneveld.

France

France were one of seven teams to debut in the 2014 World Cup when the tournament field was increased from 24 to 32 teams. They lost 5–4 to Wales in the first round, and would not make a return to the tournament in subsequent years.

Germany

Despite having home advantage for most of the tournaments, the German's best run came in 2020, when they reached the semi-finals in Austria, which included a win over their rivals, the Netherlands.

Gibraltar

The smallest nation in the tournaments by both size and population, Gibraltar's only win to date came in 2015, when they beat Italy.

Greece

Greece were the only team to debut in the 2016 World Cup after John Michael secured a Tour Card at Q-School.

Hong Kong

Hong Kong were one of the seven teams to debut in the 2014 World Cup (the only of which to be seeded) when the tournament field was increased from 24 to 32 teams. They reached the quarter-finals on their second appearance before succumbing to Scotland.

Hungary

Hungary did not play in the first World Cup, but have been present for every edition since 2012, although they've never gone past the last 16.

Iceland

Iceland will become one of three new nations participating in the World Cup, when they make their debut in 2023.

India

India were one of the seven teams to debut in the 2014 World Cup when the tournament field was increased from 24 to 32 teams. After averaging under 70 and failing to win a leg in 2014 and 2015, the latter would be their final year in the tournament.

Ireland

After a relatively unspectacular record in the competition, the Irish reached the final in 2019 after impressive wins over England and the Netherlands, before Scotland claimed the title.

Italy

Italy did not participate in the first two World Cups, but joined the roster in 2013 as a replacement for the withdrawn Philippines. As of the 2022 tournament, they have the longest record of matches without ever recording a win at the World Cup, losing all eleven of their matches.

Japan

Another ever-present, Japan's run to the semi-finals in 2019 bettered their previous best of quarter-final runs in 2013 and 2018.

Latvia

Lithuania

Lithuania were the only team to debut in the 2019 World Cup, taking the place of  after former WDF number one Darius Labanauskas secured a Tour Card at Q-School.

Malaysia

So far, Malaysia have only competed in the second and fourth editions of the tournament, losing to both Irish teams in the process.

Netherlands

The winners of the inaugural tournament, the Netherlands have won the event on three other occasions, and have only once failed to reach at least the quarter-finals stage.

New Zealand

The New Zealand team's only run of note came when they reached the quarter-finals in 2019. Due to COVID-19 travel restrictions, they couldn't participate in the 2021 tournament, ending their ever-present record.

Northern Ireland

A team who have always been a Top 6 seed, the Northern Irish team have only reached the semi-finals on two occasions.

Norway

Norway was one of the seven teams to debut in the 2014 World Cup when the tournament field was increased from 24 to 32 teams. Though they achieved their first match victory in 2016, it would be their last appearance in the tournament.

Philippines

Philippines did not compete in the first World Cup, but debuted as one of the five new teams in the 2012 World Cup, and after missing the 2017 and 2018 tournaments, they returned in 2019.

Poland

Appearing in all but the 2012 tournament, Poland have never gone beyond the last 16 stage.

Portugal

Portugal were invited to play at their first World Cup of Darts in 2020, following the late withdrawal of Singapore.

Russia

After including Anastasia Dobromyslova in the inaugural tournament, Russia would miss the next 2 tournaments, before reaching the quarter-finals in 2017, where they beat Australia on the way.

Scotland

After succumbing to Spain (twice) and South Africa in the first three tournaments, Scotland reached the final in 2015 and 2018, before winning the title in 2019 and again in 2021.

Singapore

Singapore were one of the seven teams to debut in the 2014 World Cup when the tournament field was increased from 24 to 32 teams. They have consistently been represented by Paul Lim and Harith Lim (no relation). Singapore notably knocked out the number one seeded Scotland in the first round to kick off a run to the quarter-finals in 2017.

Slovakia

Slovakia have only been invited to play at the first World Cup of Darts in 2010, where they lost to Ireland 6–3 in the first round.

Slovenia

Slovenia have only been invited to play at the first World Cup of Darts in 2010, where they lost to Sweden 6–2 in the first round.

South Africa

South Africa did not appear in the first World Cup, but debuted the second World Cup in 2012 with a quarter-final run, and have been present for every edition since, and have still been the only African representatives in the competition. They reached the quarter-finals in both 2012 and 2014.

Spain

Since then, they only progressed further than the last 16 only once in 10 years.

Sweden

The ever-present Swedes have never been beyond the last 16 stage.

Switzerland

Thailand

Thailand were one of the seven teams to debut in the 2014 World Cup when the tournament field was increased from 24 to 32 teams. After failing to win a match in five tournament appearances, the 2018 World Cup would be their last.

Ukraine

Ukraine will become one of three new nations participating in the World Cup, when they make their debut in 2023.

United States

The United States have appeared in every edition of the World Cup, reaching the last eight phase in each of the first two editions, but failing to progress further in subsequent years.

Wales

After two runners-up finishes in 2010 and 2017, the Welsh team achieved their first tournament victory in 2020 with a 3–0 defeat of No.1 seed England in the final.

References

Lists of darts players
PDC World Cup of Darts